= Kudremani =

Coordinates: 15°52′N 74°22′E

Kudremani Ghodhyachi paga (House of Horses)
- Village
- Interactive map of Kudremani
- Country: India
- State: Karnataka
- District: Belgaum

Languages
  - Official: Marathi and Kannada
- Time zone: UTC+5:30 (IST)

Kudremani is a village in Belgaum district in Karnataka, India. surrounded by Maharashtra State by all side.
